Medy Catharina van der Laan (born 14 August 1968) is a Dutch businesswoman, former civil servant and retired politician who served as State Secretary at the Ministry of Education, Culture and Science in charge of culture, media and art under Prime Minister Jan Peter Balkenende's second cabinet (2003–2006). A member of the Democrats 66 (D66) party, which she joined in 1994, she previously was an assistant to State Secretary Jacob Kohnstamm at the Ministry of Foreign Affairs. Van der Laan first joined the Ministry of the Interior in 1991 as a civil servant.

Career
A native of Spijkenisse, Medy van der Laan studied Dutch law at Radboud University Nijmegen (then Catholic University Nijmegen), where she graduated in 1990. She then worked as a civil servant for the government until her appointment as State Secretary for Education, Culture and Science under the Second Balkenende cabinet in 2003. She retained the office until she presented her resignation to Queen Beatrix in 2006 alongside those of Alexander Pechtold and Laurens Jan Brinkhorst, which led to the fall of the cabinet.

In 2015, Van der Laan became chairwoman of the trade association Energie-Nederland. In 2021, she became chairwoman of the Dutch Association of Banks (NVB) and entered the Social and Economic Council (SER).

References

External links
  Parlement.com biography

 

1968 births
Living people
Radboud University Nijmegen alumni
Democrats 66 politicians
Dutch women in politics
Dutch human resource management people
People from Spijkenisse
State Secretaries for Education of the Netherlands
Members of the Social and Economic Council